GDP-fucose protein O-fucosyltransferase 1 also known as peptide-O-fucosyltransferase 1 (O-FucT-1) is an enzyme that in humans is encoded by the POFUT1 gene.

POFUT-1 belongs to the O-Fuc family of proteins all which is involved in the transferring of o-fucose from GDP-β-L-fucose to substrates. POFUT-1 responsible for adding fucose sugars in O linkage to serine or threonine residues between the second and third conserved cysteines in EGF-like repeats on the Notch protein.  The protein is an inverting glycosyltransferase, which means that the enzyme uses GDP-β-L-fucose as a donor substrate and transfers the fucose in O linkage to the protein producing fucose-α-O-serine/threonine.

When the gene for POFUT1 is knocked out, or the expression is decreased to very low levels, all Notch signaling is destroyed, which means that fucose on Notch is essential for Notch function.  Why this is the case is not yet well understood.

Almost all glycosyltransferases reside in the Golgi apparatus.  However, POFUT1 as well as the related enzyme POFUT2 have recently been shown to reside in the endoplasmic reticulum.

Nomenclature 
GDP-fucose protein O-fucosyltransferase 1 is also known as
 Protein O-fucosyltransferase
 O-FucT-1
 FUT12
 OFUCT1
 O-FUT

Post-translational modification 

POFUT-1 is involved in the attachment of Fucose sugars to proteins, However a key pathway is the Post-transitional Modification of NOTCH signal proteins.

Pre-NOTCH proteins are translated and deposited in to the endoplasmic reticulum and are then first modified by POFUT-1 then by PGLUT-1 then exported the Golgi apparatus.  in the endoplasmic reticulum POFUT-1 utilizes its sub-strait GDP-β-L-fucose as a donor for the five carbon sugar Fucose. fucose is then attached to a serine amino acid residue.  Once Pre-notch is done being modified by POFUT-1 and POFUT-2, it is then exported to the Golgi apparatus where it is further modified and exported and incorporated into the cell membrane.

Species distribution 
As NOTCH signaling is conserved in most multi-cellular life, so to are the processes that are involved in the pathway. Because of NOTCH presence in most life forms, not just limited to the kingdom Animlia, it is also present in the kingdom plantae and kingdom fungi. There are several different Homologs in POFUT-1 present in many kingdoms of life.

As a drug target 
Because POFUT-1 is a key protein in the production of NOTCH signaling protein it has been the target of much research to disrupt it for the purpose of cancer treatment and prevention.

References

External links
 
 POFUT-1 GeneCards, Weizmann Institute of Science.
 POFUT1 Symbol Report | HUGO Gene Nomenclature Committee

Transferases
EC 2.4.1